The Lamar Lady Cardinals volleyball team represents Lamar University in the National Collegiate Athletic Association (NCAA) Division I.  The Lady Cardinals compete in the Southland Conference and play their home games at McDonald Gym, an on campus facility in Beaumont, Texas.  Brandon Crisp was named head coach on July 15, 2022.  He replaced former head coach Jordan Lay who left the program on May 5, 2022, for another position.

History
The Lady Cardinals have competed every season from 1973.  Since 1982, the program has competed as an NCAA Division I program. From 1973 to 1981, the program competed in the Association for Intercollegiate Athletics for Women (AIAW) (1973–1981). As an AIAW member, the Lady Cardinals won the state AIAW championship in 1975 and finished seventh in the AIAW Nationals. The team won regional AIAW championships in 1976 and 1977 finishing ninth in the AIAW Nationals both years and finished fourteenth in the AIAW Nationals in 1979.

Competing as an NCAA Division I program, the team has won four regular season conference championships including one American South Conference championship (1990), one Sun Belt Conference championship (1997), and two Southland Conference championships (2001, 2007). The team also won five conference tournament championships including three Southland Conference championships (1983, 1984, 2008), one American South Conference championship (1987), and one Sun Belt Conference championship (1993). The Lady Cardinals participated in the NCAA Division I Volleyball tournament four times (1983, 1984, 1993, 2008). Their best conference record was in 2007 with a 15–1 regular season Southland Conference championship record under head coach Justin Gilbert.

Awards and honors

AIAW All-Southwest Region
Source:
 Lucy Wiggins, 1975
 Laura Broughton, 1976
 Kathy MacEachern, 1976
 Melonie Floyd, 1980, '81

American South Conference
Source:
1st Team all conference
 Trisha Beissel, 1987
 Leanne Zeek, 1988, '89
 Cassi Presley, 1988
 Lisa Kachel, 1990
 Jenny Heisler, 1990

Tournament MVP
 Trisha Beissel, 1987

Southland Conference
Source:
Player of the year
 Liz Blue, 1983
 Natalie Sarver, 2002
 Molli Abel, 2007

Freshman of the year
 Wendy Krell, 2009
 Cortney Moore, 2011

Newcomer of the year
 Kathy Givens, 1983
 Trisha Beissel, 1984
 Charyl Norwood, 2000
 Shalayne Blythe, 2007
 Christine Hobbs, 2010

1st Team all conference
 Liz Blue, 1983
 Ruby Randolph, 1984, '85
 Veronica Carter, 1984, '85
 Georgia Briones, 1986
 Tracy Turner, 1986
 Charyl Norwood, 2001
 Urissa White, 2001
 Natalie Sarver, 2001, '02
 Buchi Okoh, 2006
 Molli Abel, 2007
 Adrian Meengs, 2007, '09
 Kaci Brewer, 2007
 Lauren Holdorff, 2008
 Jayme Bazile, 2010
 Chelsea Grant, 2015, '16

Coach of the year
 Katrinka Jo Crawford, 1983, '84
 Jim Barnes, 2001
 Justin Gilbert, 2007

Sun Belt Conference
Source:
Freshman of the year
 Mirian Erikson, 1991
 Kim Green, 1992

Most outstanding player
 Miriam Erikson, 1993

1st Team all conference
 Mirian Erikson, 1992, '93
 Shawn Flowers, 1993
 Kim Green, 1994
 Meredith Terrell, 1997
 Jaime Ewing, 1997

Coach of the year
 Jim Barnes, 1997

Year-by-year results
Source:

(Results reflect games through October 20, 2022.)

Postseason

NCAA Division I Tournament
Source:
The Lady Cardinals have appeared in the NCAA Division I Women's Volleyball Championship four times. They have a record of 0–4.

Home court
While McDonald Gym has been home court since 2007, both McDonald Gym and the Montagne Center have served as home courts over the life of the program. The most recent move to the Montagne Center was when McDonald Gym was completely renovated in 2006-07 as part of the $17,800,000 126,000 sq ft Sheila Umphrey Recreational Center project.  Following renovations, the volleyball team moved back to its current home, McDonald Gym.

See also
List of NCAA Division I women's volleyball programs

References

External links
 Volleyball page
 McDonald Gym

Lamar Lady Cardinals volleyball
Volleyball clubs established in 1973
1973 establishments in Texas